This article displays the qualifying draw for women's singles at the 2015 Australian Open.

The draw was announced on 14 January 2015, with play commencing the next day.

Seeds

Qualifiers

Lucky loser 
  Yulia Putintseva

Draw

First qualifier

Second qualifier

Third qualifier

Fourth qualifier

Fifth qualifier

Sixth qualifier

Seventh qualifier

Eighth qualifier

Ninth qualifier

Tenth qualifier

Eleventh qualifier

Twelfth qualifier

References 
 Qualifying Draw 
 2015 Australian Open – Women's draws and results at the International Tennis Federation

Women's Singles Qualifying
Australian Open (tennis) by year – Qualifying